"Hurts So Good" is a song by Norwegian singer Astrid S, released as the second single from her self-titled debut EP. The song was written by Lindy Robbins, Julia Michaels, Tom Meredith, and Marco Borrero. It was released on 6 May 2016.Although it received moderate success as a radio single, it later became a viral sleeper hit in 2021, after gaining popularity on the social media platform TikTok. In response to this newfound popularity, the song was re-released in 2021 on the complete edition of her debut studio album Leave It Beautiful. In March 2021, a collaboration version of the song was released, which featured Danish artist Maximillian and music producer Kina. As of June 2021, it remains her most streamed song on Spotify, garnering over 300 million listens.

Music video
The music video was directed by Andreas Öhman and filmed in Sweden, with snippets of panoramic shots from Norway.

Charts

Certifications

References

External links
 

2016 songs
2016 singles
Astrid S songs
Island Records singles
Songs written by Lindy Robbins
Songs written by Julia Michaels
Music videos shot in Norway